The Harlington Locomotive Society, also informally known as the Harlington Miniature Railway, is a trestle railway about half a mile in length through an old orchard in the village of Harlington, London Borough of Hillingdon, Greater London.

Description

The track's site, set in an orchard, was donated to the society many years ago, and is east of the High Street, Harlington.

The club has a large circuit of track of both  and  gauge incorporating a small tunnel, a clubhouse with kitchen and workshop, powered steaming bays and a brick built station and signal box. It has some resemblance to the Parkreisen of the BRD and the Pionerbahn of the DDR, though the facility is for the use of adult hobbyists and does not have the didactic purpose of training potential future railway employees.

Service facilities are located in the centre of the western loop of the track.  Locomotives are steamed there and then switched into the running line on a turntable.  A facility for checking boiler pressure performance is located here.

As early as the 1950s, the railway incorporated a treadle operated signalling system to regulate the traffic.  The weight of the wheels operated the treadles, which caused the signal behind to change to red and being cleared to green at the next treadle along the line.

Operation
Besides a membership scheme it is frequently open to the public on the second and fourth Sundays of each month between April and October and trips are afforded for a relatively small charge.

The route encircles the orchard, and is of a figure eight shape, though the arms of the "8" do not cross. Both  and  gauge locomotives can be run on the line, which is dual gauge. The passenger cars which straddle the line are of 5 in gauge.

History
The local area had many engineering companies (or companies employing engineers) including HMV, later EMI, the Aeolian Company's Factory and Fairey Aviation and the engineering facilities of Heathrow Airport are near at hand. These companies provided an extensive potential membership base that has provided a willing and expert membership. Most of the surrounding land has been developed as relatively low cost housing, and the HLS pays deference to the history of the local area, before urbanisation, one of market gardens and orchards, serving London, whilst finding a novel use as a leisure facility.

Publicity
Coverage in the specialist railway and children's press is longstanding, and Arthur Mee's Children's Newspaper carried a long article about the railway in the 1950s.

References

External links
 

Railway societies
Transport in the London Borough of Hillingdon
Tourist attractions in the London Borough of Hillingdon
Miniature railways in the United Kingdom
Clubs and societies in London
Buildings and structures in the London Borough of Hillingdon